This is a list of Bangladeshi films that were released in 2004.

Releases

See also

 2004 in Bangladesh
 List of Bangladeshi films of 2005
 List of Bangladeshi films
 Cinema of Bangladesh
 Dhallywood

References

Film
Bangladesh
  2004